Kobuleti is a district of Georgia, in the autonomous republic of Adjara. Its main town is Kobuleti.

Since 1921, the municipality's territory has been included in the Kobuleti Mazra of the Autonomous Republic of Adjara. In 1930, it was formed as a separate district. In 1962-64, it was included in the Chakvi district, with the centre in the Chakvi borough. On April 7, 1964, the Chakvi district was abolished, and the Kobuleti district was re-established with the centre in the city of Kobuleti. This administrative status was maintained until the restoration of Georgia's independence. Since 2006, after the legislative reform of the self-government system, Kobuleti district has been renamed Kobuleti municipality.
Contents

History 
Kobuleti municipality is a settlement with a centuries-old past. It has been inhabited since ancient times. Stone Age settlements, Early Bronze Age materials, Bronze Age archaeological monuments, ancient ruins, and other materials reflecting the richest historical past are abundantly found here.
In the middle of the 17th century, Gurians granted Kobuleti and its surroundings to Tavdgiridzes, who owned it until the 70s of the 18th century. After the Kuchuk-Kainarji truce, the Ottoman Empire occupied Kvemo Guria and Kobuleti. During Ottoman rule, the city was given the Turkish name Çürüksu. Churuk-Su Kaza was created, which was included in the Sanjak of Lazistan.

After the Russo-Ottoman war in 1877-1878, Kobuleti, as well as the entire Adjara, was taken over by the Russian Empire. In the second half of the 19th century, Kobuleti became an elite resort. By decree of the Russian Emperor Alexander II, the coastal part was given to the commanders-in-chief who distinguished themselves during the Russian-Turkish operation. High-ranking officials began developing the coastal Kobuleti coastal area with luxurious country houses. The healthy climate of Kobuleti became known in just a few years.

After the Sovietization of Georgia, the houses of the aristocrats came under the ownership of the red commissars. In 1923, Kobuleti received the status of a resort. In 1944, Kobuleti received the status of a city.

During the Soviet period, the Kobuleti district was one of the most important centres of citrus and tea production throughout the Soviet Union. At the same time, other branches of agriculture were also well developed here - fruit growing, horticulture, cattle breeding, sericulture, beekeeping, production of new varieties of breeding and agricultural crops, the processing and production of citrus fruits and tea, etc., were promoted here. Kobuleti district has gained a lot of popularity due to its beach and warm summer as a resort and recreation centre. Kobuleti town turned into a resort of union importance, and Tsikhisdziri into a resort of national importance. In the same period, eco-tourism in the Kintrish Nature Reserve was developed.

Administrative divisions and population 
Kobuleti Municipality is a self-governing entity with administrative boundaries and an administrative centre - the city of Kobuleti.
Self-governing bodies of the municipality are represented by the municipal council and the mayor's office. Kobuleti Municipality includes 21 territorial units. Settlements consist of one city Kobuleti, two boroughs, and 17 other territorial bodies, which include 48 villages. The population is 70,700 people, and the average density is 126.5 people per 1 km².

Settlements

Geography and climate 

Kobuleti municipality is located 10 m above sea level. Its area is 711.8 sq. km. The average annual temperature is 13–15 °C. The average amount of precipitation is 2500–3000 mm per year. The climate is subtropical.

The municipality is located in the southwestern part of Georgia and in the northern part of the Autonomous Republic of Adjara. It is located between the Black Sea, the Cholok River and the Meskheti Range. The municipality borders Ozurgeti municipality from the north (border length 55 km), Khelvachauri municipality from the southwest (border length 24 km), Keda municipality from the south (border length 33 km), Shuakhevi municipality from the southeast (border length 21 km). The length of the coastal line is 24 km. The municipality occupies an area of 711.8 km². Twenty-one thousand one hundred seventy thousand square meters of land is used for agricultural and residential purposes, which is 29.4% of the entire municipality. Protected areas cover 30,252 hectares which are 42% of the entire municipality.

Politics 
Kobuleti Municipal Assembly (Georgian: ქობულეთის საკრებულო, Kobuletis Sakrebulo) is a representative body in Kobuleti Municipality, consisting of 39 members which is elected every four years. The last election was held in October 2021. Levan Zoidze of Georgian Dream was elected mayor.

Education 
There are 29 preschools and 46 public and three private schools in Kobuleti municipality. As of 2022, 3,300 children are enrolled in preschools, and 12,500 students study in schools.
JSC Kobuleti Culture Centre and its library department, as well as a student youth house, are functioning in the municipality. There is a college Akhali Talgha in the municipality.

Culture 
In Kobuleti Municipality is functioning Kobuleti Museum, which combines expositions on the history of education, cultural history, history and archaeology of Kobuleti, and ethnography. The works of artist and sculptor Vazha Verulidze are exhibited here.

The following institutions operate on the territory of the municipality:

 Folk ensemble Kobuleti
 Guram Tamazashvili song and dance ensemble Mkhedruli
 Children's choreographic ensemble Saunje
 Folk instruments school Changi
 New Rhythms, a club for learning rhythmic dances
 Choirmaster department
 Kakuti choreographic ensemble 
 Suliko ensemble, named after S. Mamulaishvili 
 Alilo vocal group at the Leghva Rural Club
 Vakhtanguri ensemble in Dagva
 Adilo vocal group in Alambari Rural Club
 Shvarden vocal ensemble in Khala Culture House
 The vocal group at the Tsikhisdziri House of Culture
 Choreographic ensemble Sikharuli in Zedi Achkva.
 Choreographic ensemble Choloki 
 Choreographic Ensemble Chakura at the Kobuleti Rural Club
 Choreographic ensemble Taiguli in Tsetskhlauri.

Every year in February, the public reading day is celebrated in Kobuleti.

Festivals and public holidays

Sport 
JSC "Kobuleti Sports School" operates in Kobuleti Municipality, which has the following sports infrastructure:

 A well-equipped mini-football stadium with an artificial cover
 Two wrestling halls in the city of Kobuleti and the village of Kvirike
 Two bicycle cabinets
 Chess cabinet

Three republican tournaments are organized by the sports school:

 Republican tournament named after Vaso Garozashvili in freestyle wrestling
 Republican tournament named after Rostom Melashvili in freestyle wrestling
 Republican tournament named after Rezo Basilia in weightlifting

Tourism 
There is a tourism information centre in the municipality, which provides foreign and local visitors with the necessary information about attractions, tourist infrastructure, architectural and archaeological monuments, cultural events, festivals, public holidays, protected areas, transport, and other issues. The centre also helps visitors plan their preferred tours.

Types of tourism in the municipality

 Marine tourism
 Ecotourism
 Medical tourism
 Cultural tourism
 Sports tourism
 Rural tourism
 Scientific tourism
 Pilgrimage tourism
 Adventure tourism
 Culinary tourism

Economy 
The leading sectors of the economy are tourism and agriculture. Employment sectors are both public and private. Tourism in rural areas is in the stage of development. The main areas of agriculture are citrus growing, tea growing, horticulture, and animal husbandry. Small processing and food industry enterprises operate in the municipality. Service and trade are the most advanced in the municipality.

Historical landmarks and sightseeing 
Kintrish protected areas, Mtirala National Park and Kobuleti protected areas are located on the territory of the municipality. Important historical monuments on the territory of the municipality are Petra Fortress, Mamuka Fortress, Chekhedana Church, Khinotsminda Monastery, Kvirike Mosque, Tetrosani Monastery, Elia Fortress, Pichvnari Ancient Settlement and others.

Notable people

Twin towns – sister Municipalities

Gallery

See also 
 List of municipalities in Georgia (country)

References

External links 
 Official website of Kobuleti Municipality
 Districts of Georgia, Statoids.com

Municipalities of Adjara